The Quimera International Festival of Art and Culture ( or ) is an international art and cultural event that takes place in several locations of Metepec, Toluca, Mexico named after the chimera, a mythological creature with parts from multiple animals. For example, Calvario o Santuario, la parroquia de San Juan Bautista y Santa María de Guadalupe, el antiguo Convento Franciscano, el Parque Juárez. It happens once a year, in October. It offers expositions of theater, literature, dance, music and art from international guests. It is a public event and most of the expositions are for free.
It is Metepec's most important cultural festival.

Facts
 Art and cultural event
 The first Quimera festival was held in 1990
 Once a year
 International guests
 It has expositions of theater, literature, dance, music and art.
 Different locations in Metepec (Calvario o Santuario, la parroquia de San Juan Bautista y Santa María de Guadalupe, el antiguo Convento Franciscano, el Parque Juárez)
 Public event

References

External links
 

Heavy metal festivals in Mexico
Festivals established in 1990